Zarama may refer to:

Zarama tribe, Nigeria tribe, bordered by Buseni tribe
 Luis R. Zarama, a Colombian-American prelate of the Roman Catholic Church
Zarama (band), a band in the Basque Radical Rock genre